Seamer is a village and civil parish in the Hambleton district of North Yorkshire, England, near the border with the Borough of Stockton-on-Tees and  northwest of Stokesley. According to the 2011 census, the population of the village was 566, which North Yorkshire County Council estimated had dropped to 560 by 2015.

Its name is first attested in the Domesday Book of 1086 as Semer(s), with later medieval attestations including Samara. The first element is Old English sǣ 'lake'; the spelling of the second element suggests variation between Old English mere 'sea', Old English mersc 'marsh', and Old Norse marr 'lake, sea, pool'. The dominant meaning of the name therefore seems to have been 'lake by the sea'.

This rural village supports a small farming community. There are two churches in the village, a Methodist chapel and St Martin's Church of England. St Martin's is an 1822 rebuild of a medieval church, which was located in the same place. It still retains some 14th-century stained glass and is now grade II listed.  The village also has the King's Head pub, and a duck pond on the village green.

References

External links

Villages in North Yorkshire
Civil parishes in North Yorkshire